The American Motorcyclist Association (AMA) is an American nonprofit organization of more than 200,000 motorcyclists that organizes numerous motorcycling activities and campaigns for motorcyclists' legal rights. Its mission statement is "to promote the motorcycling lifestyle and protect the future of motorcycling." The organization was founded in 1924 and as of October 2016 had more than 1,100 chartered clubs.

For clubs and promoters it provides guidance and advice on running events and rallies, and allows affiliated members to vote on AMA matters. It also has a corporate membership category with representatives from the US motorcycle industry.

The AMA is the official national federation representative (FMN) for the United States of America in the Fédération Internationale de Motocyclisme (FIM), and organizes the US teams and riders for FIM-sanctioned events, including the International Six Day Enduro, Motocross Des Nations and Trials Des Nations.

History
The AMA was a whites-only organization from its inception in 1924 until the 1950s, not allowing African Americans to join for its first 30 years. A 1930 AMA membership application form, on display at the Harley-Davidson Museum, included the statement "membership is limited to white persons only". This segregation occurred at a time in American history when many motorcycle dealerships refused to sell motorcycles to black riders, forcing an entire population to create their own culture. The museum exhibit has examples of distinctive uniforms worn by motorcycle clubs, both AMA sanctioned, and those from the separate culture of black or racially desegregated clubs that proliferated as a consequence of the AMA segregation policy, such as the Berkeley Tigers MC from the San Francisco Bay Area.

Prior to the acceptance of black members, the term outlaw motorcycle club could refer to either a white counterculture biker club that was "uninterested in 'square' events and competitions", or else a club that accepted non-white members and was therefore not allowed to participate in the AMA. In the 1920s and 1930s, black hillclimbing racer William B. Johnson evaded the whites-only restriction and obtained an AMA membership card, which allowed him to compete around the Northeastern United States and become perhaps the first black AMA member.  

After the racist policy was abolished, AMA-sanctioned motorcycle clubs thrived in the era after World War II when motorcycle sales soared and club membership appealed to "better-adjusted" American veterans who enjoyed group participation and operated under strict bylaws that held club meetings and riding events.

In 1995, AMA President Ed Youngblood said that as a consequence of this racist policy from 1924 to the 1950s, blacks continued to be underrepresented in AMA events for decades after the segregationist policy was rescinded. That year, Youngblood presented black AMA member Norman Gaines in their membership advertisement in the campaign "I want to protect my rights as a motorcyclist. That's why I'm an AMA member" in both the AMA member magazine and Motorcyclist magazine.

Outlaw and one-percenter
The term one-percenter was coined after the 1947 Hollister riot in Hollister, California. The AMA is said to have responded that 99% of motorcyclists were law-abiding citizens, implying the last one percent were outlaws. The AMA now says they have no record of such a statement to the press, and call this story apocryphal. One-percenter motorcycle clubs are often also known as outlaw motorcycle gangs or OMGs according to the U.S. Bureau of Alcohol, Tobacco, Firearms and Explosives.

Competitions
The AMA sanctions over 2,000 events each year hosted by chartered clubs and promoters alike across the entire country in the disciplines of Motocross, Off-Road and Track Racing. Each discipline is guided by the AMA Racing Rule Book which is organized, written and voted on each year by AMA congress which is made up of AMA delegates from across the entire country representing their areas, disciplines and districts. In addition to a yearly congress the AMA also organizes the AMA National Awards Banquet that awards championships to all of the AMA Amateur National championship from across the country in addition to naming the AMA Racer of the Year, AMA Youth Racer of the Year, AMA Womens Racer of the Year, AMA Club of the Year and more. The AMA Board of Directors annually gives out non-competition awards for those that carry on the AMA mission. Those awards include the AMA Dud Perkins Lifetime Achievement Award, the AMA Bessie Stringfield Award, the AMA Hazel Kolb Brighter Image Award, and the Jim Viverito Friend of the AMA Award.

AMA Championship Competition

AMA Grand National Championship (1954–present)
AMA National Enduro Championship (1964–present)
AMA Motocross Championship (1972–present)
AMA Amateur National Motocross Championship (1972–present)
AMA Supercross Championship (1974–present)
AMA US National Trials Championship (1974–present)
Grand National Cross Country (1975–present)
AMA Road Racing Series
AMA Superbike Championship (1976–2015)
AMA Supersport Championship (1987–2015)
AMA Formula Xtreme (1997–2008)
AMA Pro Daytona Sportbike Championship (2009–2014)
AMA National Hare Scramble Championship (1980–2012)
AMA West Hare Scramble Championship (2013–present)
AMA East Hare Scramble Championship (2013–present)
AMA National Hare and Hound Championship (1986–present)
AMA Supermoto Championship (2003–2009)
AMA EnduroCross Championship (2004–present)
AMA Land Speed Grand Championship
AMA Extreme Off-Road Grand Championship - Tennessee Knockout (2010–present)
AMA National Grand Prix Championship (2019–present)

AMA Pro Racing
The AMA is the largest motorsports organization in the world, overseeing 80 professional and more than 4,000 amateur events each year. The AMA also maintains the Motorcycle Hall of Fame located near Columbus, Ohio. It is the designated governing body of motorcycle sport in the US by the world governing body, the Fédération Internationale de Motocyclisme (FIM).

AMA Pro Racing was formed in 1994 to respond to the growth of motorcycle racing in United States and holds many events.  The AMA Road Racing Series includes the AMA American Superbike Championship, the AMA Daytona Sportbike Championship (which incorporates the former AMA Supersport Championship and the now inactive AMA Formula Xtreme), and the new AMA Supersport Championship, which is limited to riders of age 16-21 on near stock 600cc motorcycles.

Off-road racing series include AMA Grand National Championship, AMA Supercross, AMA Motocross Championship, AMA Hillclimb, AMA Supermoto Championship and AMA EnduroCross Championship.

On March 7, 2008, the AMA Pro Racing series was sold to the Daytona Motorsports Group (DMG), headed by Roger Edmondson and Jim France.  The DMG became responsible for the AMA Superbike Series, AMA Motocross Series, AMA Flat Track Series, AMA Supermoto Series, AMA Hillclimb Series and ATV Pro Racing. The sale did not include the AMA Supercross and AMA Arenacross Series, whose rights are currently owned by Feld Entertainment.  DMG would license the AMA name and trademarks to promote the motorcycle racing series. The new management sparked criticism among some of the press and fans for allegedly alienating the factory teams  and for introducing NASCAR style rules such as rolling start and pace car. DMG was replaced by MotoAmerica as AMA Superbikes promoter in 2015.

American Motorcyclist
American Motorcyclist magazine is published by the AMA. It has a monthly circulation of 260,000 copies.

See also
Motorcycling
Motorcycling advocacy
ABATE
British Motorcyclists Federation
Federation of European Motorcyclists Associations
Helmet Law Defense League (HLDL)
Motorcycle Action Group

References

External links
AMA official website

 
Motorcyclists organizations
Motorcycle racing organizations
1924 establishments in the United States
National members of the FIM